Love's Finale is a 1925 German silent film directed by Felix Basch and starring Nils Asther and Lucy Doraine.

The film's sets were designed by the art director Carl Ludwig Kirmse.

Cast
In alphabetical order
Nils Asther as Dr. Gaston Lasar
V. Biander as Fürst von Davigny
Lucy Doraine as Elena
Lia Eibenschütz as Maria
Lina Lossen as Gaston Lasars Mutter
Albert Paulig as P. Tambourini - dancer
F. Pirsanto as Count Erneste Malfatti
Emil Rameau as Professor Troste
A. Righter as Apache
Gerhard Ritterband as Boy
Luigi Serventi as Count Ermete Chassard
Leopold von Ledebur as Count von Keroual

References

External links

Films of the Weimar Republic
Films directed by Felix Basch
German silent feature films
German black-and-white films
UFA GmbH films